Morozov is a lunar impact crater that is located on the far side of the Moon. It was named after Russian natural scientist Nikolai Morozov. It lies to the north of the crater Gregory and to the east-southeast of Ibn Firnas. Less than two crater diameters to the west-southwest of Morozov is Zanstra.

This is a worn and eroded crater formation, particularly along the western rim where a pair of parallel marks (either grooves or crater chains) cross the inner wall, running to the south-southeast. No impacts of note lie along the rim or crater interior, although the side is also somewhat damaged along the northeast. The crater is otherwise unremarkable.

Some sources list this crater's name as Morosov.

Satellite craters
By convention these features are identified on lunar maps by placing the letter on the side of the crater midpoint that is closest to Morozov.

References

External links

Morozov at The Moon Wiki

Impact craters on the Moon